Pomacentrinae is one of four subfamilies in the family Pomacentridae which includes the clownfishes and the damselfishes. It is the most diverse of the subfamilies in the Pomacentridae with around 21 genera and approximately 200 species.

Characteristics
The species within the Pomacentrinae have orb-like to moderately elongated bodies and they do not have spiny caudal rays projecting out of the caudal peduncle. The majority of species display territoriality and they defend of feeding territory from members of their own species and other species which compete with them for food. They feed on algae, which they appear to cultivate, actively increasing the algal productivity within their territories. Many species lay demersal eggs, which are guarded and fanned by the male. One species, the freshwater demoiselle Neopomacentrus taeniurus is known to enter estuaries and even reaches into the lowest stretches of streams.

Classification
The 5th Edition of Fishes of the World states that the Pomacentrinae is most likely to be paraphyletic but does not break the subfamily into different lineages.  Other authorities split the Pomacentrinae into the subfamilies Abudefdufinae and Stegastinae and include the Amphiprioninae, the clownfishes as the tribe Amphiprionini within the Pomacentrinae.

Genera
The following genera are classified in the subfamily Pomacentrinae:

 Abudefduf Forsskål, 1775
 Amblyglyphidodon Bleeker, 1877
 Amblypomacentrus Bleeker, 1877
 Cheiloprion M.C.W Weber, 1913
 Chrysiptera Swainson, 1839
 Dischistodus Gill, 1863
 Hemiglyphidodon Bleeker, 1877
 Hypsypops Gill, 1861
 Mecaenichthys Whitley, 1929
 Microspathodon Günther, 1862
 Neoglyphidodon Allen, 1991
 Neopomacentrus Allen, 1975
 Nexilosus Heller and Snodgrass, 1903
 Parma Günther, 1862
 Plectroglyphidodon Fowler & Ball, 1924
 Pomacentrus Lacépède, 1802
 Pomachromis Allen & Randall, 1974
 Pristotis Rüppell, 1838
 Similiparma Hensley, 1986
 Stegastes Jenyns, 1840
 Teixeirichthys J.L.B. Smith, 1953

References

 
Pomacentridae
Fish subfamilies
Taxa named by Charles Lucien Bonaparte